Nataliya Yershova (born 29 April 1955) is a Russian former backstroke swimmer. She competed in two events at the 1972 Summer Olympics for the Soviet Union.

References

External links
 

1955 births
Living people
Russian female backstroke swimmers
Olympic swimmers of the Soviet Union
Swimmers at the 1972 Summer Olympics
Place of birth missing (living people)
Soviet female backstroke swimmers